White Collar Blue is  an Australian television series made by Knapman Wyld Television for Network Ten from 2002 to 2003.

Starring Peter O'Brien as Joe Hill and Freya Stafford as Harriet Walker, the series dealt with a division of the police force working in the city of Sydney and the personal and professional tensions affecting their work and lives.

In the pilot episode, Harriet is introduced as the new face to Kingsway station, transferring from the "White Collar" federal police to the "Blue Collar" New South Wales Police. Throughout the series Harriet must deal not only with her husband's brutal murder and the revelation of his adultery, but with learning to adjust and fit into her new surroundings.

Joe is Harriet's new partner, and isn't exactly welcoming to her as an addition to the team. With two daughters from previous marriages, Joe needs to juggle his homelife, his dedication to the job and his relationship with Nicole Brown, played by Jodie Dry.

The other cops at the station are Ted Hudson, played by Richard Carter, Sophia Marinkovitch (Brooke Satchwell) and Theo Rahme (Don Hany), and each have their own secrets and problems to deal with.

The series was canceled after two seasons, however it can be found on cable TV both in Australia and overseas (notably in Canada and New Zealand).

Regular cast
 Det. Joe Hill - Peter O'Brien
 Det. Harriet Walker - Freya Stafford
 Sophia Marinkovitch - Brooke Satchwell
 Theo Rahme - Don Hany
 Ted Hudson - Richard Carter
 Nicole Brown - Jodie Dry
 Magistrate Fran Hoffmann - Linda Cropper
 Eliot Marinkovitch - Dylan Redlich

External links
 White Collar Blue at the National Film and Sound Archive
 
White Collar Blue - Ep 21 at Australian Screen Online

Network 10 original programming
2000s Australian crime television series
Television shows set in Sydney
2002 Australian television series debuts
2003 Australian television series endings